Spiders & Snakes may refer to:
Spiders & Snakes (song), by Jim Stafford
Spiders & Snakes (band), a band